Backstage is a Canadian drama series about a performing arts high school created by Jennifer Pertsch and Lara Azzopardi. The series aired in Canada on Family Channel from March 18 to December 9, 2016, and in the United States on Disney Channel from March 25 to September 30, 2016. The series was also released on Netflix in early 2017, with season two premiering on the streaming service on September 30, 2017. The series' ensemble cast includes Devyn Nekoda, Alyssa Trask, Josh Bogert, Aviva Mongillo, Matthew Isen, and Julia Tomasone.

Premise 
The trials and tribulations of the students at Keaton School of the Arts, which includes dancers, singers, musicians, and artists. The characters frequently break the fourth wall, talking to the viewers in so-called "confessionals".

Episodes

Cast 

 Devyn Nekoda as Vanessa
 Alyssa Trask as Carly
 Josh Bogert as Miles 
 Aviva Mongillo as Alya
 Matthew Isen as Jax
 Julia Tomasone as Bianca
 Adrianna Di Liello as Jenna
 Colin Petierre as Sasha
 Mckenzie Small as Scarlett
 Romy Weltman as Kit
 Isiah Hall as Denzel (season 1)
 Kyal Legend as Julie
 Chris Hoffman as Park
 Jane Moffat as Helsweel
 Thomas L. Colford as Beckett (season 2)

Production 
Actors in the series are all real dancers and musicians embodying the true spirit of the performing arts. Directors for the series include top music video directors such as RT!, Director X, Wendy Morgan, and Warren P. Sonoda as well as Mario Azzopardi and Lara Azzopardi. The first season production order consisted of 30 episodes.

On May 10, 2016, it was announced that Backstage was renewed for a 30-episode second season for a 2017 broadcast on Family Channel in Canada. On September 30, 2017, the show's cast revealed on social media that the entire second season had been picked up by Netflix.

Broadcast 
The series premiered on Family Channel in Canada on March 18, 2016, and on Disney Channel in the United States on March 25, 2016. Disney Channel secured the license for the series in several countries in Europe, Africa, and the Middle East. It premiered on Disney Channel in the United Kingdom and Ireland on May 9, 2016, and on Disney Channel in Australia and New Zealand on October 28, 2016.

The second season had its world premiere on July 28, 2017 in the UK and Ireland. The entire second season was released in Australia on the ABC Me app and on the ABC iview on-demand service from September 15 to October 15, 2017. In the United States, the second season was released on Netflix on September 30, 2017.

Reception

Critical 
Backstage has received positive, albeit lukewarm reviews from critics. Common Sense Media gave the series three out of five stars, saying that while it "doesn't really break new ground", it "does touch on many issues that are worthwhile for kids".

U.S. ratings 
 
}}

Music 
 The primary source for performers and writers is the end credits of episodes.

Season 1

Season 2

References

External links 
 Backstage at Family Channel (Canada)
 Backstage at Disney Channel (U.S.)
 

2010s Canadian drama television series
2010s Canadian high school television series
2010s Canadian teen drama television series
2016 Canadian television series debuts 
2017 Canadian television series endings
English-language television shows
Family Channel (Canadian TV network) original programming
Television series by DHX Media
Television series by Fresh TV